Erbezzo is a comune (municipality) in the Province of Verona in the Italian region Veneto, located about  west of Venice and about  north of Verona. It is part of the Thirteen Communities, a group of villages which historically speak the Cimbrian language.

Erbezzo borders the following municipalities: Ala, Bosco Chiesanuova, Grezzana, and Sant'Anna d'Alfaedo.

Demographic evolution

References

External links
 www.baldolessinia.it/erbezzo/

Cities and towns in Veneto